The Moeraki River is a river of the West Coast Region of New Zealand's South Island. It flows west from the Southern Alps, veering northwest as it approaches the coast. It flows into the eastern end of the small Lake Moeraki before flowing out the western end to reach the Tasman Sea 20 kilometres northeast of Haast.

See also
List of rivers of New Zealand

References

Rivers of the West Coast, New Zealand
Westland District
Rivers of New Zealand